Zhejiangosaurus (meaning "Zhejiang lizard") is an extinct genus of ankylosaurian dinosaur from the Upper Cretaceous (Cenomanian stage) of Zhejiang, eastern China. It was first named by a group of Chinese authors Lü Junchang, Jin Xingsheng, Sheng Yiming and Li Yihong in 2007 and the type species is Zhejiangosaurus lishuiensis ("from Lishui", where the fossil was found). It has no diagnostic features, and thus is a nomen dubium.

Description 
Zhejiangosaurus could grow up to 4.5 m (17 ft) in length and was 1.4 metric tons in weigh.

Material 
Material for Zhejiangosaurus consists of the holotype, ZNHM M8718, a partial skeleton which has preserved a sacrum with eight vertebrae, a complete right ilium and partial left ilium, a complete right pubis, the proximal end of the right ischium, two complete hindlimbs, fourteen caudal vertebrae, and some unidentified bones. These remains come from Liancheng, in the Chinese administrative unit of Lishui on the province of Zhejiang and they were collected from the Cenomanian-age Chaochuan Formation.

Systematics 
On the species description, Lü et al. (2007) found Zhejiangosaurus to belong to the ankylosaurian family Nodosauridae.

See also 

 Timeline of ankylosaur research

References 

Nodosaurids
Late Cretaceous dinosaurs of Asia
Fossil taxa described in 2007
Taxa named by Lü Junchang
Paleontology in Zhejiang
Lishui
Nomina dubia
Ornithischian genera